Abimael Youngs Nicoll was an officer in the United States Army who served as Adjutant General and acting Inspector General of the U.S. Army from 1807 to 1812.

See also

List of Adjutant Generals of the U.S. Army
List of Inspectors General of the U.S. Army

References

Year of birth unknown
Year of death unknown
Adjutants general of the United States Army
Princeton University alumni
Inspectors General of the United States Army
United States Army colonels